The Sarsang Hydro Power Plant is a hydro power plant located de jure in the Tartar District of Azerbaijan, de facto in the Martakert Province of the self-proclaimed Republic of Artsakh. In 1990, the station generated 81.9 million kWh.

See also
 List of power stations in Azerbaijan

References

External links

Hydroelectric power stations in Azerbaijan
Hydroelectric power stations built in the Soviet Union
Buildings and structures in the Republic of Artsakh